Andronymus marcus is a butterfly in the family Hesperiidae. It is found in Ghana, Cameroon, the Republic of the Congo and the Democratic Republic of the Congo.

References

Butterflies described in 1980
Erionotini